Trictena barnardi is a species of moth of the family Hepialidae. It was described by Norman Tindale in 1941, and is endemic to Western Australia.

References

External links
Hepialidae genera

Moths described in 1941
Hepialidae